Košnica pri Celju is a settlement in the City Municipality of Celje in eastern Slovenia. The area is part of the traditional region of Styria. It is now included with the rest of the municipality in the Savinja Statistical Region.

Name
The name of the settlement was changed from Košnica to Košnica pri Celju in 1955.

Geography
Košnica pri Celju is a dispersed settlement above the right bank of the Savinja River on the southwestern outskirts of Celje. It includes the hamlets of Spodnja Kočnica to the south, closer to the river, and Zgornja Košnica to the north, below the southeast slope of Hom Hill. Lisce Hill stands to the northeast, and the Slomnik Ridge rises to the southwest. Košnica Creek, a tributary of the Savinja River, flows through the village. The soil is stony and the terrain is partially karstified.

History
During the interwar period, a road was built through Košnica pri Celju from Celje to Laško. Construction of the road required destruction of a rock formation known as the Virgin Cliffs, which stood above the Savinja River. During the Second World War, German forces shot Anton Bobnič in the hamlet of Zgornja Košnica on July 22, 1942 for collaboration with the Liberation Front. In the postwar period, extensive residential housing was built in the hamlet of Spodnja Kočnica.

Mass graves
Košnica pri Celju is the site of three known mass graves from the period immediately after the Second World War. All three graves are located south of the road from Košnica pri Celju to Liboje, south of the house at Košnica pri Celju no. 13, in a meadow alongside Košnica Creek. They contain the remains of ethnically Slovene and German residents of Celje that were murdered between May and July 1945. Field investigations of the graves were carried out in July 2010. Mass Grave 1, also known as the Women's Mass Grave, contains the remains of 400 to 600 victims. Mass Grave 2 also contains the remains of 400 to 600 victims. Mass Grave 3 contains the remains of 600 to 1,000 victims.

References

External links
Košnica pri Celju on Geopedia

Populated places in the City Municipality of Celje